The Cascata delle Marmore or Marmore Falls is a man-made waterfall created by the ancient Romans. Its total height is 165 m (541 feet), making it the tallest man-made waterfall in the world.

It is located 7.7 km from Terni, a provincial capital of the Italian region of Umbria. 

Its source is a portion of the waters of the river Velino. After flowing through Piediluco lake near the community of Marmore (italian), it pours into the valley below formed by the river Nera. The flow of the waterfall depends on an off and on scale with a published schedule to support the power company nearby.

History

The Velino river flows through the highlands that surround the city of Rieti. In ancient times, it fed a wetland in the Rieti Valley that was thought to bring illness (probably malaria). To remove that threat to the city of Rieti, in 271 BC, the Roman consul Manius Curius Dentatus ordered the construction of a canal (the Curiano Trench) to divert the stagnant waters into the natural cliff at Marmore. From there, the water fell into the Nera river below. However, that solution created a different problem: when the Velino river was in flood stage, its water flowed through the Nera toward the city of Terni, threatening its population.  The issue was so contentious between the two cities that the Roman Senate was forced to address it in 54 BC. Aulus Pompeius represented Terni, and Cicero represented Rieti. The Senate did nothing about the problem, and the problem remained the same for centuries. 

The nearby Ponte del Toro bridge was built between 1st c. BC and the 1st c. AD for an additional drainage channel from the Marmore plateau which needed to bridge over another channel from the Velino.

Lack of maintenance in the canal resulted in a decrease in the flow, until eventually the wetland began to reappear. In 1422, Pope Gregory XII ordered the construction of a new canal to restore the original flow (the Gregorian Trench or Rieti Trench).

In 1545, Pope Paul III ordered that a new canal be built (the Pauline Trench). The plan was to expand the Curian Trench and to build a regulating valve to control the flow. Upon its completion some 50 years later (in 1598), Pope Clement VIII inaugurated the new work, and named it after himself: the Clementine Trench.

In the following two centuries, the presence of the canal was problematic for the countryside in the valley below, as the Nera often flooded it. In 1787, Pope Pius VI ordered architect Andrea Vici to modify the leaps below the falls, giving the falls its present look and finally resolving the majority of the problems.

In 1896, the newly formed steel mills in Terni began using the water flow in the Curiano Trench to power their operation. In the following years, engineers began using the water flow to generate electricity.

Current status
Most of the time, the water in the canals above the falls is diverted to a hydroelectric power plant, so the flow in the falls themselves is heavily reduced. Piediluco Lake, above the falls, is used as a reservoir for the power plant. The Galleto power plant, built in 1929, is architecturally interesting. Its capacity is about 530 MW. To control the operation of the power plant, and to satisfy tourists, the falls are turned on according to a set schedule, achieving a spectacular effect at full flow. An alarm is sounded first, then the gates are opened, and in a few minutes the small stream is transformed into a full-sized river rushing into the void below.

Normally, the falls are turned on between 12:00 and 13:00 and again between 16:00 and 17:00 every day, with additional times on holidays. An entrance fee is charged to visit the falls and the surrounding area.

A path along the falls allows the visitor to hike up to the top of the falls. Along the way, a tunnel leads to an observatory just next to the falls, where a visitor is likely to get soaked. Another observatory near the top affords a wide view of the falls and of the Nera valley below.

See also
 List of waterfalls
 List of waterfalls by height

External links 

Official website for the falls, with schedule and admission prices

Terni
Waterfalls of Umbria
Roman sites of Umbria